The Hohe Weisse or Hochweisse is a mountain in the Texel group of the Ötztal Alps. Its parent
peak is the Hochwilde. The easiest route to the summit is the Willy-Ahrens-weg.

References

Mountains of South Tyrol
Mountains of the Alps
Alpine three-thousanders
Ötztal Alps